Robert William Speck (April 16, 1915 – April 5, 1972) was a Canadian politician who was the first Mayor of the Town of Mississauga, and the town's only elected mayor. Speck died while in office and Reeve Chic Murray was appointed by the town's council to take his place.

Speck is buried at Springcreek Cemetery in Clarkson. Robert Speck Parkway, a short road in central Mississauga leading to Square One Shopping Centre, is named in his honour.

References

External links 
 Profile at Heritage Mississauga

Mayors of Mississauga
1915 births
1972 deaths